The Venerable (Ronald) Berkeley Cole (1913–1996) was an eminent  Anglican priest and author in the first half of the mid 20th century.

After an earlier career as a Registrar with the London County Freehold and Leasehold Properties Ltd he was ordained in 1943. He began his career with a curacy in Braunstone after which he was Succentor of Leicester Cathedral. He was Vicar of St Philip, Leicester from 1950 to 1973. He was Archdeacon of Loughborough  from 1953 to 1963 and of Leicester from then until 1980. His last post was as Rural Dean of Reps.

Notes

1913 births
Archdeacons of Loughborough
Archdeacons of Leicester
1996 deaths